Bälinge may refer to:

Bälinge, Luleå, an urban area in Luleå Municipality, Sweden
Bälinge, Uppsala Municipality, an urban area in Uppsala Municipality, Sweden
Bälinge IF, a sports club in Bälinge, Uppsala Municipality